Terence John Lowe (born 27 May 1943) is an English former footballer who played at right-back for Port Vale between 1960 and 1966.

Career
In his youth, Lowe played for Stoke City before joining Port Vale in June 1960. His debut came in the Potteries derby 1–0 win over Stoke in the Supporters' Clubs' Trophy final on 24 April 1961, at the end of the 1960–61 season. He made his debut in the Football League in the 1961–62 season, making six appearances in the Third Division. Manager Norman Low was replaced by Freddie Steele in October 1962, and Lowe established himself in Steele's first team plans with 40 league and cup appearances in the 1962–63 campaign. However he featured only three times in the 1963–64 season, as Selwyn Whalley firmly established himself in the right-back slot. Lowe played only twice in 1964–65 as the "Valiants" were relegated into the Fourth Division under Jackie Mudie's stewardship. He played 13 matches in the 1965–66 season, and was handed a free transfer away from Vale Park in May 1966.

Career statistics
Source:

References

1943 births
Living people
People from Cheadle, Staffordshire
English footballers
Association football fullbacks
Stoke City F.C. players
Port Vale F.C. players
English Football League players